The Louisville Fire was an arena football team that played its home games at the Brown-Forman Field in Freedom Hall in Louisville, Kentucky. They were a 2001 expansion team of the af2.  Their owner/operator was former Pro Bowl lineman and Louisville native Will Wolford. The team was somewhat successful. After a rocky first few seasons they finally found success in 2004 and then made it all the way to the Arena Cup in the 2005 season.

On December 19, 2001, Jeff Brohm was named the head coach of the Louisville Fire arena football team. The Fire started the 0–7 before they defeated the Carolina Rhinos 31–28 to improve to 1–7. The Fire would finish the season 2–14.

In 2003, English was hired to replace Brohm as the head coach of the Louisville Fire af2 team. He was fired after just two games with a record of 2–2.

In July 2007, it was announced that the team planned on selling portions of the team to local ownership (aka the NFL's Green Bay Packers) in an attempt to boost season ticket sales and then buy the shares back in time before the team joined the AFL.

In November 2008, the Louisville Fire ceased operations.

Award winners 

 2004 – Takua Furutani – International Player of the Year
 2005 – Matthew Sauk – Offensive Player of the Year
 2005 – Danny Kight – Kicker of the Year
 2006 – Brett Dietz – Rookie of the Year
 2006 – Rob Mager – Offensive Player of the Year
 2008 – Elizabeth "Liz" Horrall – Miss Louisville Fire Football

Season-by-season 

|-
| 2001 || 6 || 10 || 0 || 6th NC Midwest || --
|-
| 2002 || 2 || 14 || 0 || 4th NC Midwest || --
|-
| 2003 || 5 || 11 || 0 || 3rd NC Midwest || --
|-
| 2004 || 9 || 7 || 0 || 2nd NC Midwest || Won NC Round 1 (Quad City 53–48)Lost NC Semifinal (Tulsa 49–42)
|-
| 2005 || 11 || 5 || 0 || 2nd AC East || Won AC Round 1 (Macon 55–54)Won AC Semifinal (Manchester 69–56)Won AC Championship (Florida 70–40)Lost ArenaCup VI (Memphis 63–41)
|-
| 2006 || 9 || 7 || 0 || 4th AC East || Lost AC Round 1 (Memphis 83–61)
|-
| 2007 || 9 || 7 || 0 || 3rd AC Midwest || Won AC Round 1 (Spokane 62–35)Lost AC Semifinals (Green Bay 37–27)
|-
| 2008 || 8 || 8 || 0 || 4th AC Midwest || --
|-
!Totals || 62 || 71 || 0
| colspan="2"| (including playoffs)
|}

Coaching staff

See also 

 Sports in Louisville, Kentucky
 Louisville Cardinals

References

External links 

 

 
Defunct af2 teams
American football teams in Kentucky
American football teams established in 2001
American football teams disestablished in 2008
2001 establishments in Kentucky
2008 disestablishments in Kentucky
Defunct sports teams in Louisville, Kentucky